Below is a list of foreign electoral interventions.

Albania

1991 election (by United States) 

During the 1991 election campaign, politicians of the center-right Democratic Party of Albania claimed that the US government would provide financial assistance to the country. The US government confirmed these claims in a meeting with Democratic Party members.

1992 election (by United States and Italy) 

The United States Agency for International Development, National Democrat Institute and the International Republican Institute provided anti-socialist political groups with aid, training, media support and funding. The US embassy also publicly supported the Democratic Party of Albania. The Los Angeles Times also reported that the US government provided advisors and vehicles to the campaign of the Democratic Party of Albania, and threatened to withhold foreign aid to Albania if the Socialist Party of Albania was victorious in the elections.

Italy supported the Socialist Party of Albania, with Italian former prime minister Bettino Craxi accepting honorary membership in the party to give them legitimacy. Italy also gave more aid to Albania than any other country.

Australia

2019 election (by China) 

In late 2019, media outlets around the world have reported on alleged efforts by the People's Republic of China to infiltrate the Parliament of Australia by recruiting a spy to run in a constituency during the 2019 Australian federal election.

2022 election (by China) 

In February 2022, the Australian Security Intelligence Organisation revealed a failed attempt by the Chinese government to use a proxy to finance federal Labor candidates in New South Wales.

Bangladesh

1973 election (by Soviet Union) 

According to details from the Mitrokhin Archive, the Soviet Union covertly supported the Awami League in Bangladesh.

Bolivia

1964 election (by United States) 

According to documents provided by the State Department Office of the Historian, the CIA covertly financed media, political groups, trade unions, student groups and youth groups in order to break the influence of communists and alleged Cuban operatives in Bolivia, as well as to create a stable government that was pro-USA. Over $1,150,000 was dedicated to this task across 3 years. Starting in August 1964, the US government began to covertly fund the MNR (then the largest political party in Bolivia) during the elections. Following the 1964 military coup by General René Barrientos the US government covertly funded him and propaganda supporting his government.

1966 election (by United States) 

According to documents provided by the State Department Office of the Historian, the CIA covertly funded groups supporting General Barrientos during the 1966 elections and his rivals in order to ensure they'd accept the legitimacy of the elections. With CIA assistance, Barrientos forces killed Che Guevara the next year.

2002 election (by United States) 

In the Bolivian elections of 2002, the U.S., which had been financing the eradication of coca farms, instructed Ambassador Manuel Rocha to warn Bolivians against voting for socialist candidate Evo Morales, stating that doing so could "jeopardize American assistance and investment." USAID also created the "political party reform project" in Bolivia in 2002, whose aim was to "help build moderate, pro-democracy political parties that can serve as a counterweight to the radical MAS or its successors". The move largely backfired, increasing support for Morales, who finished second in the election. Morales would ultimately be elected president of Bolivia in 2006.

Brazil

1955 election (by United States) 

Fearing a rise of João Goulart, who the US considered to be a communist demagogue, the United States Information Service increased its budget to educate Brazilians on the alleged dangers of communism and communist front groups, as well as drawing links between the Brazilian Communist Party and the Soviet Union. The US also gave grants to the conservative National Democratic Union. According to documents provided by the State Department Office of the Historian, the USA also provided an increase in credit to the ruling administration to help them win the 1955 elections.

1962 election (by United States) 

According to Tim Weiner's book Legacy of Ashes, the first use of the brand-new state-of-the-art taping system ordered by John F. Kennedy in the White House in 1962 was to discuss plans to subvert the Brazilian government of João Goulart. Kennedy and his ambassador to Brazil Lincoln Gordon discussed spending $8 million to swing the next elections and to prepare for a military coup against Goulart due to fears Brazil could become a "second Cuba". The CIA and AFL-CIO pushed money into Brazilian political life to people who opposed Goulart. Electoral interference by the US failed to oust Goulart, and the CIA supported a coup that deposed him in 1964, leading to Brazil being ruled by a military dictatorship until 1985.

Canada

1962 and 1963 (by United States) 
Canadian Prime Minister John Diefenbaker (a Conservative) had famously bad relations with U.S. President John F. Kennedy.  Kennedy is widely seen as having publicly intervened in Canadian affairs by inviting the then-opposition leader Lester B. Pearson (a Liberal) to the White House for a banquet with Nobel Prize winners just before the official start of 1962 campaign, failing to rescind the offer when the election was formally called, holding a private meeting with Pearson in the White House, and mentioning only Pearson in his remarks to the Nobel laureates. In the aftermath of the Cuban Missile crisis, Diefenbaker's policy was attacked by the U.S. State department in a statement which McGeorge Bundy bragged had "toppled" the Diefenbaker government.  The U.S. embassy in Ottawa leaked anti-Diefenbaker stories to the media covering the campaign and the Kennedy-friendly Newsweek magazine ran cover story attacking Diefenbaker.  Besides these public interventions, Kennedy secretly sent his personal pollster Lou Harris to work for Pearson's Liberals under an assumed name, despite refusing to allow Harris to work for the British Labour Party under Harold Wilson.  "One of the highlights of my life,” Mr. Harris told The Canadian Press, “was helping Pearson defeat Diefenbaker."

2019 election (by China) 

The Canadian Security Intelligence Service (CSIS) warned Liberal Party leader Justin Trudeau that Chinese Communist Party-affiliated proxies had covertly funded at least 11 federal candidates in the 2019 election. Four months after the 2019 Canadian federal election, the Privy Council Office warned that election interference by China was "likely to be more persistent and pervasive in future elections."

2021 election (by China) 

The Rapid Response Mechanism Canada reported that it detected Chinese Communist Party (CCP) disinformation operations to dissuade voters from supporting the Conservative Party of Canada during the 2021 federal election. Kenny Chiu, an outspoken critic of Chinese government's crackdown on dissent and protest in Hong Kong, was a key target of this disinformation campaign. CSIS also produced reports on the Chinese government's strategy to interfere in Canada's 2021 federal election.

2022 election (by China) 

According to The Globe and Mail, CSIS determined that China's consul-general in Vancouver, Tong Xiaoling, mentored pro-Beijing candidates to run in the 2022 Vancouver municipal election.

Chile

1964 election (by United States and Soviet Union)

Between 1960 and 1969, the Soviet government funded the Communist Party of Chile at a rate of between $50,000 and $400,000 annually. In the 1964 Chilean elections the U.S. government supplied $2.6 million in funding for candidate Eduardo Frei Montalva, whose opponent, Salvador Allende was a prominent Marxist, as well as additional funding with the intention of harming Allende's reputation. As Kristian Gustafson phrased the situation:

It was clear the Soviet Union was operating in Chile to ensure Marxist success, and from the contemporary American point of view, the United States was required to thwart this enemy influence: Soviet money and influence were clearly going into Chile to undermine its democracy, so U.S. funding would have to go into Chile to frustrate that pernicious influence.The U.S. involvement was later revealed by the Church Committee in 1975.

1970 election (by United States and Soviet Union)

According to information released as part of the findings of the Church Committee, the U.S. Central Intelligence Agency supported the kidnapping of the Chilean Army Commander-in-Chief General René Schneider in an attempt to prevent the congressional confirmation of Salvador Allende. The attempt failed and Schneider was shot in the process. He died three days later from his wounds. Thereafter, the U.S. continued a vigorous overt and covert campaign to undermine Allende's Presidency, which may have created the conditions for Allende's overthrow in a violent coup, although the U.S. was not directly implicated in the coup. American official Henry Kissinger was quoted by Newsweek in 1974 saying this about Chile: "I don't see why we have to let a country go communist due to the irresponsibility of its own people".

According to details from the Mitrokhin Archive, the Soviet Union covertly supported Salvador Allende.

Congo-Kinshasa

1960 election (by Soviet Union, 1960) 

The Soviet Union covertly supported the campaign of Patrice Lumumba's Mouvement National Congolais party. Shortly after Lumumba's victory, the Congo Crisis broke out and Lumumba was assassinated in January 1961. This paved the way for the dictatorship of Mobutu Sese Seko.

Costa Rica

1966 election (by United States and Nicaragua) 

According to documents provided by the State Department Office of the Historian, National Liberation Party (PLN) leader Daniel Oduber Quirós actively sought out support from the United States and his party during the elections. There was also common speculation in Costa Rica that the National Unification Party (PUN) was being funded by outside forces, notably the Somoza family in Nicaragua. The US government offered to use contacts in the AFL-CIO to assist the PLN in their election campaign. Walter and Victor Reuther provided assistance to the campaign by collecting funds in Detroit. The US government preferred a PLN victory, but acknowledged both candidates were pro-USA and anti-communist.

1970 election (by Soviet Union) 

The KGB quietly aided the presidential campaign of José Figueres Ferrer by providing his campaign a loan of $300,000 via the Marxist-Leninist People's Vanguard Party in return for a promise of diplomatic recognition of the Soviet Union. Once reinstalled as President, Figueres kept his promise.

1986 election (by United States) 

The International Republican Institute supported the conservative Social Christian Unity Party (PUSC) to help them win the 1986 elections. They also gave them grants of $75,000, $100,000 and $145,000 in 1986, 1987 and 1988 respectively to the "Asociación para la Defensa de la Libertad y Democracia en Costa Rica" (Association for the Defense of Liberty and Democracy in Costa Rica) a conservative political group.

Czechoslovakia

1990 election (by United States, United Kingdom, Germany and Belgium) 

According to The New York Times, National Endowment for Democracy (NED) funding for political parties was considered controversial in Czechoslovakia, as it was seen as foreign interference favoring political parties close to Vaclav Havel. The NED provided $400,000 in grants, much of which were used to buy computers, fax machines and copiers that were helpful in the campaign. The British Conservative Party also provided 2 campaign experts, and Christian Democrat parties in Belgium and Germany sent more electronics.

Denmark

1973 election (by Soviet Union) 

The Soviet Union covertly funded the Communist Party of Denmark in the 1973 elections.

1975 election (by Soviet Union) 

The Soviet Union covertly funded the Communist Party of Denmark in the 1975 elections.

Dominican Republic

1966 election (by United States) 

According to documents provided by the State Department Office of the Historian, the US government supported the campaign of Joaquin Balaguer. The government planned to support him "in such a way that United States sponsorship cannot be proven in any way." Methods of supporting Balaguer include financial assistance, advice, media, information and classified forms of assistance.

El Salvador

1984 election (by United States) 

According to an article from The Washington Post, the US used diplomatic pressure, media support and covert funding to support the campaign of Jose Napoleon Duarte.

Finland

1956 election (by Soviet Union) 

The Soviet Union overtly supported the electoral campaign of Urho Kekkonen in the 1956 elections.

1962 election (by Soviet Union) 

The Soviet Union overtly supported the electoral campaign of Urho Kekkonen in the 1962 elections.

France

1974 election (by Soviet Union) 

According to details from the Mitrokhin Archive, the KGB undertook "active measures" against the campaign of Valéry Giscard d'Estaing.

1988 election (by Soviet Union) 

According to details from the Mitrokhin Archive, the Soviet Union provided 10 million francs to support the French Communist Party.

2007 election (by Libya)

According to French newspaper Mediapart, Nicolas Sarkozy's presidential campaign received 50 million Euros in donations from the Libyan leader, colonel Muammar Gaddafi, which is over twice the French limit for individual campaign donations of 22 million Euros. After Sarkozy's victory, Gaddafi went on a 5-day state visit to France, during which the Libyan government purchased military equipment, including 14 Rafale fighter jets. Ziad Takieddine, a French-Lebanese businessman with close ties to Libya, admitted to Mediapart that he had made three trips from Tripoli to France to deliver suitcases filled with 200 and 500 euro notes to Sarkozy. After the election, Gaddafi was invited. In March 2018, Sarkozy was held in custody over these allegations. He was interrogated for 25 hours by the police, during which he denied any wrongdoing, before being released under special judicial supervision.

2017 election (by Russia)

The 2017 Macron e-mail leaks were leaks of more than 20,000 e-mails related to the campaign of Emmanuel Macron during the 2017 French presidential elections, two days before the final vote. The leaks garnered an abundance of media attention due to how quickly news of the leak spread throughout the Internet, aided in large part by bots and spammers and drew accusations that the government of Russia under Vladimir Putin was responsible. The e-mails were shared by WikiLeaks and several American alt-right activists through social media sites like Twitter, Facebook, and 4chan.

Germany

1972 election (by Soviet Union) 

According to documents provided by the State Department Office of the Historian, the US government felt that the KGB supported the Social Democratic Party of Germany-Free Democratic Party social-liberal coalition and "instructed its chief operatives abroad to mobilize all resources in support of their victory". This was done to increase positive relations with East Germany

1980 election (by Soviet Union) 

According to details provided in the Mitrokhin Archive, the KGB covertly supported the Social Democratic Party of Germany in the 1980 election.

2017 election (by Turkey) 

In August 2017, Turkish president Recep Tayyip Erdoğan called for all his "countrymen" in Germany to vote against the CDU/CSU, the SPD and the Green Party in the upcoming German federal election. Erdoğan called these parties, as well as German Chancellor Angela Merkel, "enemies of Turkey". Merkel condemned these statements, and responded that all Germans had to right to vote freely without foreign meddling in the electoral process. German foreign minister Sigmar Gabriel affirmed Erdoğan's segments were an "unprecedented act of interference in the sovereignty of our country." There are at least 4 million people of Turkish origin in Germany, most of whom customarily align with the SPD or the Green Party politically.

Greece

1958 election (by United States and Soviet Union) 

During the 1958 election, the CIA "spent large sums of money" on a "wide variety of strategies" in order to covertly support the National Radical Union (ERE).

In an exclusive interview with To Vima, Soviet leader Nikita Khrushchev heavily criticized NATO and claimed that NATO was preventing the resolution of the Cyprus conflict and that the "colonialists" were trying to impose an illegitimate constitution and partition on Cyprus. He also claimed that NATO leaders planned to install nuclear missiles on Greek soil, which would endanger Greek citizens in the event of a nuclear war. This interview was considered by Konstantinos Karamanlis to be overt electoral interference in favour of anti-NATO parties like EDA and the Progressive Agricultural Democratic Union (PADE).

1961 election (by United States) 

During the 1961 election, the CIA covertly funded the National Radical Union (ERE) and the Centre Union (EK) in order to prevent a victory of the socialist All-Democratic Agricultural Front (EDA). The Greek military, then linked to the CIA, also played a role in ensuring the ERE was victorious by encouraging the public to vote for them.

1974 election (by Soviet Union) 

According to documents provided by the State Department Office of the Historian, following the legalization of the Communist Party of Greece in 1974, the Soviets covertly gave the party more than $2 million for its election campaign.

Grenada

1984 election (by United States) 

According to investigative journalist Bob Woodward, the CIA spent $675,000 on education and "getting out the vote" in Grenada after the 1983 invasion. Woodward claims the CIA also used opinion polls to ensure a "strongly pro-US" candidate won the election.

Guatemala

1958 election (by United States) 

The CIA covertly aided the electoral campaign of José Luis Cruz Salazar (es) of the National Liberation Movement with a payment of $97,000 in order to oust the government of Miguel Ydígoras Fuentes of the National Democratic Reconciliation Party in the 1958 general election.

Guinea

2010 election (by France) 

Vincent Bolloré, a French billionaire close to then-French president Nicolas Sarkozy, allegedly gave financial support to presidential candidate Alpha Condé in the 2010 Guinean presidential election. He is suspected of having offered Condé discount on advertisements from his ad agency, which he didn't equally offer to his opponent Cellou Dalein Diallo. Condé went on to become Guinean president and gave Bolloré's company port concessions. Bolloré formally denies any wrongdoing.

India

1967 election (by Soviet Union) 

According to details provided in the Mitrokhin Archive, the KGB covertly supported the Communist Party of India in the 1967 election.

1977 election (by Soviet Union) 

According to details provided in the Mitrokhin Archive, the KGB covertly supported the Indian National Congress in the 1977 election.

Indonesia

1955 election (by United States) 

The CIA covertly gave a over $1 million to centrist and progressive Muslim political parties to cut support for Sukarno and the Communist Party of Indonesia during the 1955 legislative election. The operation was a total failure. Later, the USA supported the anti-Sukarno Permesta rebellion in 1958 and the military-led 1965 anti-communist massacres.

Iran

1952 election (by United States) 

Historian Ervand Abrahamian, in an interview with Democracy Now!, said U.S. State Department documents declassified in 2017 reveal that the U.S. strategy was to undermine Mohammad Mosaddegh through parliament and the Central Intelligence Agency (CIA) spent lots of money to get their 18 favorable candidates elected.

1980 election (by United States) 

The United States covertly supported the campaign of Ahmad Madani, who later fled to the USA.

Israel

1996 election (by United States)

U.S. President Bill Clinton later acknowledged that, in the wake of the assassination of Prime Minister Yitzhak Rabin, Clinton interfered on behalf of Shimon Peres against Benjamin Netanyahu. Clinton later said that he "tried to do it in a way that didn't overtly involve me".

Italy

1948 election (by United States, Soviet Union and Vatican City) 

In the 1948 Italian elections the administration of Harry Truman, allied with the Roman Catholic Church, funneled millions of dollars in funding to the Christian Democracy party and other parties through the War Powers Act of 1941 in addition to supplying military advisers, in an effort to prevent an election victory for the Popular Democratic Front (FDP), a united front comprising the Italian Socialist Party (PSI) and the Italian Communist Party (PCI), both of which had played key roles in the wartime resistance movement. At the advice of Walter Dowling, the U.S. also invited Prime Minister Alcide De Gasperi on an official visit and made a number of related economic concessions.

Conversely, the Soviet Union funneled as much as $10 million monthly to the communists and leveraged its influence on Italian companies via contracts to support them. However, many of their efforts were ad hoc in comparison, and the Christian Democrats eventually won in a landslide.

1953 election (by Soviet Union) 

The Soviet Union covertly provided funding for the Italian Communist Party during the elections.

1958 election (by United States) 

According to documents provided by the State Department Office of the Historian, the US believed that providing economic support would contribute to a "favorable election atmosphere" for centrist political parties. The US actively monitored the political situation in Italy and was anxious about a victory by the Italian Communist Party.

1972 election (by Soviet Union) 

According to details provided in the Mitrokhin Archive, the KGB covertly supported the Italian Communist Party in the 1972 elections.

1976 election (by Soviet Union) 

According to details provided in the Mitrokhin Archive, the KGB covertly supported the Italian Communist Party in the 1976 elections, where they saw their biggest electoral wins in their history.

1983 election (by United States and Saudi Arabia) 

According to investigative journalist Bob Woodward, the CIA requested Saudi Arabia spend $2 million to assist in a secret operation to prevent a victory of the Italian Communist Party in the 1983 elections.

Jamaica

1976 election (by United States) 

Michael Manley and many other members of the PNP suspected "Chile style" CIA interference in the 1976 elections against his democratic socialist government.

1980 election (by United States and Germany) 

During the 1980 elections the CIA and Christian Democrats funded opposition groups against Michael Manley and the PNP.

Japan 
The Liberal Democratic Party (LDP) of Japan received secret American funds during the 1950s and 1960s. This was justified by U.S. Ambassador to Japan Douglas MacArthur II when he said, without evidence, "the Socialists in Japan had their own secret funds from Moscow", adding that funding the LDP helped to "project American power".

1952 election (by United States) 

According to documents provided by the State Department Office of the Historian and evidence collected by journalist Tim Weiner, the US interfered in Japan's first elections following the end of the US-led Allied occupation of Japan, starting with publicly withholding details of the new US-Japanese security treaty from the public in order to stave off criticism of the government. The US also quietly funded the Liberal Party in exchange for the party acting in US interests such as fighting off anti-base protests and supporting a military alliance with the USA.

1955 election (by United States) 

According evidence collected by journalist Tim Weiner. The US began to provide covert funding to the new Liberal Democratic Party during Japanese elections.

1958 election (by United States) 

The CIA undertook a number of actions to ensure a victory for the Liberal Democratic Party. This included diplomatic measures such as persuading the South Korean government to grant Japan more liberal fishing rights. Encouraging Vietnam and Indonesia to reach reparations agreements, delivering speeches promoting markets for Japanese exports, speeding the release of war criminals, covertly offering campaign funds, decreasing military spending and promising to relax military presence on the island (a sensitive issue in Japan) and quietly recruited allies in the party through bribes. The CIA also offered payments to Japan Socialist Party members in order to weaken potential anti-American movements.

1960 election (by United States) 

According to documents provided by the State Department Office of the Historian and evidence collected by journalist Tim Weiner. The US continued to provide covert funding and electoral advice to the Liberal Democratic Party, often disguising advisors as US-based businessman. By the early 1960s, annual payments of between $2 and $10 million to the party and individual politicians had become "so established and so routine," reported Assistant Secretary of State for Intelligence Roger Hillsman, that they were a normal part of bilateral relations.

1963 election (by United States) 

According to documents provided by the State Department Office of the Historian and evidence collected by journalist Tim Weiner. The US continued to provide covert funding and electoral advice to the Liberal Democratic Party, often disguising advisors as US-based businessman.

1967 election (by United States) 

According evidence collected by journalist Tim Weiner. The US continued to provide covert funding to the Liberal Democratic Party during Japanese elections.

1969 election (by United States) 

According evidence collected by journalist Tim Weiner. The US continued to provide covert funding to the Liberal Democratic Party during Japanese elections. According to Weiner, the funding was terminated in the 1970s and he does not state if the US funded the LDP during the 1972 elections.

1972 election (by Soviet Union) 

The Soviet Union covertly supported the Japan Socialist Party during the 1972 elections by pressuring Japanese companies that did trade with the USSR to financially support the Japan Socialist Party. In exchange for $10 million in contracts with the USSR, these companies provided $100,000 to the Japan Socialist Party.

Korea

1948 election (by United Nations and the Soviet Union) 

The 1948 Korean elections were overseen primarily by the United Nations Temporary Commission on Korea, or UNTCOK. The United States planned to hold separate elections in the south of the peninsula, a plan which was opposed by Australia, Canada and Syria as members of the commission. According to Gordenker, the commission acted:

in such a way as to affect the controlling political decisions regarding elections in Korea. Moreover, UNTCOK deliberately and directly took a hand in the conduct of the 1948 election.

Conversely the Soviet Union forbade such elections in the north of the peninsula all together. Faced with this, UNTCOK eventually recommended the election take place only in the south, but that the results would be binding on all of Korea.

Laos

1955 election (by United States) 

According to documents provided by the State Department Office of the Historian, the US government funded the Royal Lao Army, gave money to the government and provided food aid to villages to end supports for communism.

1958 election (by United States) 

According to documents provided by the State Department Office of the Historian, the US government deeply feared a possible Pathet Lao victory in Laos' elections. In response, they gave money to the royal government in order to carry out projects to boost living standards in rural villages (such as constructing schools, roads, medical facilities, wells and general building repairs). The program cost around $500,000. The US government also directly funded conservative candidates.

1960 election (by United States and Thailand) 

During the 1960 elections, the US and Thailand covertly funded the Committee for the Defence of National Interests and bribed their opponents to withdraw. The elections were rigged and marked with extensive fraud. This helped contribute to the 1960 Laotian coups.

1967 election (by United States) 

According to former CIA agent and US diplomat James R. Lilley the CIA worked to ensure "favorable" outcomes in the National Assembly of Laos. He claims "we thought it was important for Vang Pao to have more of a say in the political governing of the country. We figured out whom to support without letting our fingerprints show. As part of our nation building" effort in Laos, we pumped a relatively large amount of money to politicians who would listen to our advice." He also claims that CIA-friendly politicians won 54 out of 57 seats in the National Assembly and that he was called to "Mr. Tammany Hall" by a US Ambassador.

Latvia

1998 election (by Russia) 

During the Latvian elections, the Russian government overtly supported the pro-Russia National Harmony Party.

Lebanon

1957 election (by United States) 

According to documents provided by the State Department Office of the Historian, in response to growing communist activities in Lebanon and the threat of Syrian-Egyptian influence, the US government gave Lebanon $10 million in economic aid and $2 million in military aid. This was designed to be given to the population (via projects such as low-cost housing, highway construction, irrigation, flood control, rural electrification, water supplies and airport expansion) to boost popular support for the ruling government led by Camille Chamoun before the 1957 Lebanese general election, as well as enhancing the capabilities of the Lebanese military.

This failed to stop instability breaking out the country, culminating with a US military intervention in the 1958 Lebanon crisis.

Malaysia

1959 election (by United States) 

According to documents provided by the State Department Office of the Historian, during the first elections to form the Malaysian parliament, the USA covertly aided the Alliance Party who were running against the Malaysian Islamic Party and the Malayan Peoples' Socialist Front.

Malta

1971 election (by United States) 

According to documents provided by the State Department Office of the Historian, during the second elections Malta had following independence from the British Empire, the USA covertly aided the Nationalist Party who were running against the Malta Labour Party.

Mauritius

1982 election (by United States) 

The CIA covertly gave financial support to Seewoosagur Ramgoolam of the Mauritian Labour Party in the 1982 general election in an attempt to oust Anerood Jugnath and the Mauritian Militant Movement-Mauritian Socialist Party alliance. This was due to fear that the MMM would close Mauritius' ports to the United States Navy and open up Soviet Armed Forces bases, in addition to challenging US claims to Diego Garcia. The US government authorized the Mauritian government to sell off food aid given to the country via USAID for $2 million, enabling them to create 21,000 jobs to help them win the election.

Mongolia

1996 election (by United States) 

During the 1996 Mongolian election, that National Endowment for Democracy helped unite several political parties, intellectuals, businessmen, students and other activists into the Democratic Union Coalition and then trained them in grassroots campaigning and membership recruiting. They also assisted in distributing 350,000 copies of a manifesto calling for private property rights, a free press and foreign investment to help convince people to vote out the Mongolian People's Revolutionary Party.

New Zealand

2017 election (by China) 

The heads of the New Zealand Security Intelligence Service and Government Communications Security Bureau confirmed attempted interference by China in the 2017 New Zealand general election.

Nepal

1959 election (by United States and India) 

The CIA covertly assisted via "covert operations" for B.P. Koirala and the Nepalese Congress in winning the 1959 election. The Communist Party of India also funded the Communist Party of Nepal during the elections.

Nicaragua

1984 election (by United States) 

The United States covertly funded and bribed anti-Sandinista opposition leaders to boycott the 1984 elections and convince the world Nicaragua ran a "Soviet style" election.

1990 election (by United States) 

The United States heavily funded and assisted the anti-Sandinista opposition groups in Nicaragua to oust them from power.

Pakistan

1970 election (by Soviet Union) 
According to details from the Mitrokhin Archive, the Soviet Union covertly supported the Awami League in Pakistan in order to assist Bangladeshi independence.

Palestine

2006 election (by United States and Israel) 

During the 2006 Palestinian elections, Israel hoped that Fatah would prevail over Hamas, the latter being a Sunni-Islamic fundamentalist organization. Israeli Prime Minister Ariel Sharon wanted to halt the elections if Hamas ran candidates. However, U.S. President George W. Bush objected to such election interference, and Hamas won, despite millions of clandestine dollars flowing from the Bush administration to Fatah during the closing weeks of the campaign. Then-Senator Hillary Clinton commented at the time: "we should have made sure that we did something to determine who was going to win."

Panama

1984 election (by United States) 

According to details released during Manuel Noriega's trial, the CIA and drug cartels funded the presidential campaign of Nicolás Ardito Barletta Vallarino.

1989 election (by United States) 

The CIA covertly launched a campaign to oust General Manuel Noriega, then President of Panama, from office. CIA agents helped set up radio and TV transmitters for opposition groups and sanctions were placed on Panama. It was noted that the event happened after a failed coup with alleged US backing in 1988.

Peru

1962 election (by United States) 

According to documents provided by the State Department Office of the Historian, Richard N. Goodwin accused the CIA and State Department of funding the American Popular Revolutionary Alliance in the 1962 elections, starting in 1961. He also claimed the CIA supported the labor movement against Juan Velasco Alvarado.

Poland

1947 election (by Soviet Union) 

Although the agreements at the Yalta Conference called for "free and unfettered" elections in Poland, the Kremlin and the Polish Workers' Party had no intention of permitting an honest election. Soviet leader Joseph Stalin was well aware that if Poland held a free election, it would result in an anti-Soviet government. Electoral laws introduced before the elections allowed the government – which since its establishment in 1944 by the Polish Committee of National Liberation had been dominated by the Communists – to remove 409,326 people from the electoral rolls. The 1947 election (along with the previous 1946 referendum) was organized and closely monitored by UB (secret police) specialists, who worked closely with their Soviet counterparts like Aron Pałkin and Siemion Dawydow, both high-ranking officers from the Soviet MGB. In some regions, over 40% of the members of the electoral commissions who were supposed to monitor the voting were recruited by the UB. Bolesław Bierut, head of the provisional Polish parliament (State National Council) and acting President of Poland, asked for Soviet assistance in the election.

Philippines

1953 election (by United States)

The United States Government, including the Central Intelligence Agency, had a strong influence on the 1953 elections, and candidates in the election fiercely competed with each other for U.S. support. CIA agent Edward Lansdale purportedly ran the successful 1953 presidential campaign of Ramon Magsaysay.

2016 election (by China)

Former Foreign Secretary Albert del Rosario, alleged the Chinese officials in February 2019 bragged about having influenced the 2016 presidential elections to favor President Rodrigo Duterte. Duterte said the accusation is false, remarking that he did not need help from any foreign country to secure votes needed to win the elections.

Russia

1996 election (by United States) 

The first Russian president Boris Yeltsin won his second term in the 1996 presidential elections

A team of private US citizens, campaign experts organized by Felix Braynin, provided assistance to the Yeltsin campaign. The team consisted of Steven Moore, Joe Shumate, George Gorton and Richard Dresner, who worked in Russia four months and received $250,000, plus payment of all costs and unlimited budget to conduct surveys and other activities.

Simultaneously the US administration ensured a US$10.2 billion International Monetary Fund loan to Russia  to keep the national economy and pro-Western liberal government afloat. The loan funds were fraudulently misused by Yeltsin's inner circle, and the IMF knowingly turned a blind eye to these facts. Although the aggressive pro-Yeltsin campaign boosted his approval rate from an initial 6% to the 35% that he got during the first round of elections, and later made him win the second round against the Communist competitor, Gennady Zyuganov, with 54% to 41%, there were wide speculations that the official results were rigged.

San Marino

1959 election (by United States and Italy) 

According to documents provided by the State Department Office of the Historian, the US and Italy each provided San Marino's government with $850,000 in anticipation of the 1959 elections. This was done to prevent an electoral win of the previously successful Sammarinese Communist Party.

Somalia

1964 election (by United States) 

According to documents provided by the State Department Office of the Historian, the US began covert actions to influence the 1964 Somali parliamentary elections in order to ensure the election of government and parliamentary officials in Somalia favorably disposed to the West and allocated $200,000 for this purpose. The program was terminated in 1967.

Sri Lanka

2015 election (by India) 

It was alleged that the Indian Research and Analysis Wing had played a role in uniting the Sri Lankan opposition, to bring about the defeat of Mahinda Rajapaksa. There had been growing concern in the Indian government, on the increasing influence of economic and military rival China in Sri Lankan affairs. Rajapaksa further upped the ante by allowing 2 Chinese People's Liberation Army Navy submarines to dock in 2014, without informing India, in spite of a stand still agreement to this effect between India and Sri Lanka. The growing Chinese tilt of Rajapaksa was viewed by India with unease. Further, it was alleged, that a RAW agent, helped coordination of talks within the opposition, and convincing former PM Ranil Wickremasinghe not to stand against Rajapaksa, but to choose a common opposition candidate, who had better chances of winning. The agent is also alleged to have been in touch with Chandrika Kumaratunga, who played a key role in convincing Maithripala Sirisena to be the common candidate.

Taiwan/Republic of China

1996 election (by China) 

In the run-up to the 1996 Taiwanese presidential election, the People's Liberation Army launched ballistic missiles within the Republic of China's territorial waters off the ports of Keelung and Kaohsiung. This action was intended to intimidate the Taiwanese electorate from voting for presidential candidates that Beijing branded "absolutely identical in attempting to divide the motherland."

2000 election (by China) 

In the run-up to the 2000 Taiwanese presidential election, Zhu Rongji, the premier of the People's Republic of China at the time, warned that voters should "not just act on impulse at this juncture, which will decide the future course that China and Taiwan will follow" and should "shun a pro-independence candidate", further stating that "[n]o matter who comes into power in Taiwan, Taiwan will never be allowed to be independent. This is our bottom line and the will of 1.25 billion Chinese people." According to Christopher R. Hughes, emeritus professor of International Relations at the London School of Economics, the Chinese government later concluded that the statement helped to produce a counterproductive effect.

2012 election (by China) 

In November 2011, the Alliance for the Reunification of China, an organization affiliated with the mainland's China Council for the Promotion of Peaceful National Reunification, held seminars across Taiwan calling for people to vote for Ma Ying-jeou.

2018 election (by China) 
The Republic of China's leaders, including President Tsai Ing-wen and Premier William Lai, have repeatedly accused the People's Republic of China of spreading fake news via social media to influence voters and support candidates more sympathetic to Beijing ahead of the 2018 Taiwanese local elections. Chinese defector Wang Liqiang claimed he had been instructed to interfere in Taiwan's 2018 midterm elections as well as the upcoming race. “The story was not as shocking in Taiwan as it was in other parts of the world,” said Lev Nachman, a PhD candidate at the University of California, Irvine, studying social movements and focusing on Taiwan. “It is not news to Taiwanese people that China has been co-opting local organisations for political influence.”

2020 election (by China) 

In the run-up to the 2020 Taiwanese general election, organizations with links to mainland China launched libel lawsuits against journalists investigating their ties and coordination with Chinese government institutions such as the Taiwan Affairs Office.

2022 election (by China) 

In the run-up to the 2022 Taiwanese local elections, Taiwanese law enforcement carried out raids under the Anti-Infiltration Act on individuals suspected of buying votes on behalf of China. In October 2022, the Chinese government's Taiwan Affairs Office warned that the 2022 Taiwanese constitutional referendum was part of a push toward Taiwanese independence.

Thailand

1969 election (by United States) 

According to documents provided by the State Department Office of the Historian, the US government covertly supported Thanom Kittikachorn of the United Thai People's Party, although much of the information remains classified.

Togo

2010 election (by France) 

Vincent Bolloré, a French billionaire close to then-French president Nicolas Sarkozy, allegedly gave financial support to presidential candidate Faure Gnassingbé in the 2010 Togolese presidential election. He is accused of having offered a Gnassingbé discount on advertisements from his ad agency, which he failed to offer to his opponent, Jean-Pierre Fabre. Gnassingbé went on to become the Togolese president and gave port concessions to Bolloré's company. Bolloré formally denies any wrongdoing.

Ukraine

2004 election (by Russia)

The Russian government publicly attempted to influence the 2004 Ukrainian presidential election. Russian President Vladimir Putin gave public support for candidate Viktor Yanukovych and made public visits to Ukraine on his behalf. According to Kempe and Solonenko, "The overall interest of the Russian elite was to keep Ukraine as a reliable neighbor and partner." This was accomplished by channeling Russian funding and expertise directly into the campaign of Yanukovych or the government of Ukraine, in an effort described as "nakedly partisan". Meanwhile, the U.S., Canada, Poland and Slovakia gave money to build political parties in Ukraine.

2014 election (by Russia)

Pro-Russian hackers launched a series of cyberattacks over several days to disrupt the May 2014 Ukrainian presidential election, releasing hacked emails, attempting to alter vote tallies, and delaying the final result with distributed denial-of-service attacks. Malware that would have displayed a graphic declaring far-right candidate Dmytro Yarosh the electoral winner was removed from Ukraine's Central Election Commission less than an hour before polls closed. Despite this, Channel One Russia "reported that Mr. Yarosh had won and broadcast the fake graphic, citing the election commission's website, even though it had never appeared there." According to Peter Ordeshook: "These faked results were geared for a specific audience in order to feed the Russian narrative that has claimed from the start that ultra-nationalists and Nazis were behind the revolution in Ukraine."

United Kingdom

2016 Brexit referendum (by Russia, United States and Saudi Arabia)

There is ongoing investigation by the UK Electoral Commission, the UK Parliament's Culture Select Committee, and the US Senate, on alleged Russian interference in the United Kingdom European Union membership referendum of 23 June 2016.

In May 2017, it was reported by the Irish Times that £425,622 had potentially been donated by sources in Saudi Arabia to the "vote leave" supporting Democratic Unionist Party for spending during the referendum.

Some British politicians accused U.S. President Barack Obama of interfering in the Brexit vote by publicly stating his support for continued United Kingdom membership of the European Union.

2019 Conservative Party leadership election (by Saudi Arabia)

Jeremy Hunt's donors include Ken Costa, investment banker with close ties to Saudi Arabia's Crown Prince Mohammad bin Salman.

2019 election (by India)
During the 2019 United Kingdom general election, The Times of India reported that supporters of Narendra Modi's ruling Bharatiya Janata Party (BJP) were actively campaigning for the Tories in 48 marginal seats, and the Today programme reported that it had seen WhatsApp messages sent to Hindus across the country urging them to vote Conservative.

Some British Indians spoke out against what they saw as the BJP's meddling in the UK election.

United States

1796 election (by France)
 

The Jay Treaty between the United States and England took effect in February 1796, and the French government was very unhappy about it. The French foreign minister, Charles Delacroix, wrote that France "must raise up the [American] people and at the same time conceal the lever by which we do so…. I propose…. to send orders and instructions to our minister plenipotentiary at Philadelphia to use all means in his power to bring about a successful revolution, and [George] Washington's replacement."  The French minister (ambassador) to the United States, Pierre Adet, openly supported the Democratic-Republican Party and its presidential nominee Thomas Jefferson, while attacking the Federalist Party and its presidential nominee John Adams.

The foreign intrigue perpetrated by France was unsuccessful, as Adams won the election with an electoral vote count of 71-68.  A significant factor that helped to thwart the French efforts was George Washington's Farewell Address, in which the outgoing president condemned foreign meddling.

1940 election (by Nazi Germany and the United Kingdom)

In October 1940, seeking to derail the reelection of incumbent U.S. President Franklin D. Roosevelt, Nazi Germany bribed a U.S. newspaper to publish a document that Foreign Minister Joachim von Ribbentrop hoped would convince American voters that Roosevelt was a "warmonger" and "criminal hypocrite". Leaking the captured Polish government document failed to have its intended effect, and Republican Party presidential nominee Wendell Willkie lost the election.

From 1940 until "at least 1944", the British Secret Intelligence Service (SIS) orchestrated what Politicos Steve Usdin described as an influence campaign "without parallel in the history of relations between allied democracies" to undermine U.S. politicians opposed to American participation in World War II—much of which was documented in a declassified history by William Stephenson, the head of the SIS front organization British Security Co-ordination (BSC). Usdin stated that "SIS ... flooded American newspapers with fake stories, leaked the results of illegal electronic surveillance and deployed October surprises against political candidates."

1960 election (by Soviet Union)

Adlai Stevenson II had been the Democratic Party presidential nominee in 1952 and 1956, and the Soviets offered him propaganda support if he would run again for president in 1960, but Stevenson declined to run again. Instead, Soviet leader Nikita Khrushchev backed John F. Kennedy in that very close election, against Richard Nixon with whom Krushchev had clashed in the 1959 Kitchen Debate. On 1 July 1960 a Soviet MiG-19 shot down an American RB-47H reconnaissance aircraft in the international airspace over the Barents Sea with four of the crew being killed and two captured by the Soviets: John R. McKone and Freeman B. Olmstead. The Soviets held on to those two prisoners, in order to avoid giving Nixon (who was the incumbent Vice President of the United States) an opportunity to boast about his ability to work with the Soviets, and the two United States Air Force officers were released just days after Kennedy's inauguration, on 25 January 1961. Khrushchev later bragged that Kennedy acknowledged the Soviet help: "You're right. I admit you played a role in the election and cast your vote for me...." Former Soviet ambassador to the United States Oleg Troyanovsky confirms Kennedy's acknowledgment, but also quotes Kennedy doubting whether the Soviet support made a difference: "I don't think it affected the elections in any way."

1968 election (by South Vietnam)

In the last months of the presidential election between Richard Nixon and Hubert Humphrey, President Lyndon B. Johnson announced an October surprise, intended to aid Humphrey, by declaring a cessation to the bombing in the ongoing Vietnam War and a new round of peace negotiations. In response, Humphrey's popularity grew, eventually leading Nixon by three percentage points.

However, the South Vietnamese government, in consultation with the Nixon campaign, announced three days prior to the election that they would not be participating in the talks, and Nixon went on to win the vote by less than a percentage point.

1980 election (by Iran)

Throughout the 1980 presidential election, negotiations were ongoing between the administration of Jimmy Carter and the government of Iran regarding 52 American citizens who had been taken hostage in November 1979. Although it was recognized that negotiations were nearing a successful conclusion, the government of Iran delayed their release until after the election, potentially in retaliation for the decision of Carter to admit the deposed Iranian leader Mohammad Reza Pahlavi to the United States for cancer treatment.

Opinions differ as to the intentional nature of the delay with regard to the outcome of the election. A ten-month investigation by the U.S. House of Representatives concluded that there was "virtually no credible evidence to support the accusations." However, former Iranian President Abolhassan Banisadr claimed there was a deal between Reagan and Iran to delay the release in exchange for arms.

In a declassified memo from 1980, the CIA concluded "Iranian hardliners – especially Ayatollah Khomeini" were "determined to exploit the hostage issue to bring about President Carter’s defeat in the November elections."

1984 election (by Soviet Union)

When Ronald Reagan was running for reelection as president, the Soviet Union opposed his candidacy and took active measures against it. Soviet intelligence reportedly attempted to infiltrate both the Republican National Committee and Democratic National Committee.

1996 election (by China)

In February 1997, officials from the Federal Bureau of Investigation announced they had uncovered evidence that the Government of China had sought to make illegal foreign contributions to the Democratic National Committee. Despite the evidence, both the presidential administration and the Chinese government denied any wrongdoing.

2012 election (by Israel)

In 2012, former Israeli Prime Minister Ehud Olmert claimed that Prime Minister Benjamin Netanyahu tried to undermine President Barack Obama in favor of Republican candidate Mitt Romney. Former Prime Minister Ehud Barak said that the interference cost Israel aid. Netanyahu has denied that. The accusations included claims that Obama had deliberately snubbed Netanyahu, and another implied that an appearance in a television advertisement was designed by Netanyahu to give support to Romney.

2016 (by multiple countries)
Interference in the 2016 election by entities connected to the Russian government was a scandal that dominated the news during the first half of the presidency of Donald Trump.

2016 election (by Russia)

In October 2016, the U.S. government accused Russia of interfering in the 2016 United States elections using a number of strategies including the hacking of the Democratic National Committee (DNC) and leaking its documents to WikiLeaks, which then leaked them to the media. Russia has denied any involvement.

In response, on 29 December 2016, President Barack Obama expelled 35 Russian diplomats and broadened sanctions on Russian entities and individuals.

In January 2017, following a British intelligence tip-off, the U.S. Intelligence Community expressed "high confidence" that Russian President Vladimir Putin ordered an influence campaign designed to interfere in the 2016 U.S. elections, undermine confidence in the U.S. democratic process, harm Secretary Hillary Clinton's chances, and help Donald Trump win.

2016 election (by Ukraine)

In July 2016, candidate Donald Trump was asked about the Russian annexation of Crimea from Ukraine. Trump's statement indicating that he would recognize Crimea as Russian caused alarm in Ukraine, with the Ukrainian Ambassador to the USA Valeriy Chaly writing an article critical of Trump for breaking from the Republican party platform. Other prominent Ukrainian politicians wrote highly critical social media posts, including former prime minister, Arseny Yatseniuk and interior minister Arsen Avakov.

In August 2016, the National Anti-Corruption Bureau of Ukraine and Ukrainian legislator Serhiy Leshchenko publicized ledgers alleging that Paul Manafort (Donald Trump's campaign manager) had received $12.7 million in illicit payments from Ukraine's pro-Russia Party of Regions. Manafort resigned from the Trump campaign shortly after. As part of Manafort's plea deal before his second trial in 2018, Manafort admitted to receiving over $60 million from pro-Russia political groups for his work in Ukraine, laundering more than $30 million of it through foreign companies and bank accounts to hide it from the IRS, thereby avoiding liability for $15 million in taxes.

While it has been claimed that Ukraine appeared "to strain diplomatic protocol dictating that governments refrain from engaging in one another's elections", there is no evidence of a top-down effort by Ukraine to influence the 2016 US Presidential Election.

2016 election (by Saudi Arabia and the United Arab Emirates)
Special counsel Robert Mueller investigated a meeting between Donald Trump Jr. and an emissary for two Gulf monarchies. In August 2016, Trump Jr. had a meeting with envoy representing Saudi Arabia's Crown Prince and de facto ruler Mohammad bin Salman and Abu Dhabi's Crown Prince Mohammed bin Zayed Al Nahyan, the de facto ruler of the United Arab Emirates. The envoy offered help to the Trump presidential campaign, although it is unclear what form of help they provided to the Trump campaign if any. The meeting included Lebanese-American businessman George Nader, Joel Zamel, an Israeli specialist in social media manipulation, and Blackwater founder Erik Prince. Donald Trump also registered eight new businesses in Saudi Arabia during the election campaign.

2016 election (by Israel)
According to The Times of Israel, Trump's longtime confidant Roger Stone "was in contact with one or more apparently well-connected Israelis at the height of the 2016 US presidential campaign, one of whom warned Stone that Trump was “going to be defeated unless we intervene” and promised “we have critical intell[sic].” The exchange between Stone and this Jerusalem-based contact appears in FBI documents made public".

2018 election (by Russia, China and Iran)

U.S. Director of National Intelligence Dan Coats accused Russia, China and Iran of trying to influence the 2018 United States elections.

2020 election (by Russia, China, and Iran)

U.S. officials have accused Russia and Iran of trying to influence the 2020 United States elections. Donald Trump has separately accused China of influencing the election.

On 13 February 2020, American intelligence officials advised members of the House Intelligence Committee that Russia was interfering in the 2020 election in an effort to get Trump re-elected. China and Iran were found to support the candidacy of Joe Biden though no active election interference by either country was reported. Bloomberg News reported in January 2020 that American intelligence and law enforcement were examining whether Russia was involved in promoting disinformation to undermine Joe Biden as part of a campaign to disrupt the 2020 election. On 21 February 2020, The Washington Post reported that, according to unnamed US officials, Russia was interfering in the 2020 Democratic Party presidential primaries in an effort to support the nomination of Senator Bernie Sanders.

On October 21, 2020, Director of National Intelligence John Ratcliffe said that Iran and Russia had obtained US voter registration data and that Iran had sent intimidating emails to voters under the name "Proud Boys," a far-right group.

In March 2021 a declassified report found that Russia's electoral interference was meant to support Trump, Iran's electoral interference was meant to hurt Trump, and China did not seek to influence the outcome.

2022 election (by China) 
In March 2022, the U.S. Department of Justice indicted individuals, including a Ministry of State Security officer, for surveilling and conspiring to smear and physically attack Chinese American political candidate Xiong Yan. In September 2022, Meta Platforms removed fake accounts linked to a China-based influence operation ahead of the 2022 United States elections. In October 2022, Mandiant reported that Chinese state-backed advanced persistent threat group Dragonbridge was attempting to dissuade Americans from voting in the 2022 midterm elections via fake social media accounts and falsified news articles. In early November 2022, Twitter disrupted several China-based fake account networks aimed at influencing the U.S. midterms.

Venezuela

1958 election (by Soviet Union) 
The Soviet Union covertly supported Wolfgang Larrazábal who represented a Democratic Republican Union-Communist Party of Venezuela coalition in the 1958 Venezuelan general election. Wolfgang lost to Rómulo Betancourt of Democratic Action.

Vietnam

1971 election (by United States) 

According to documents provided by the State Department Office of the Historian, the US government carried out a number of covert actions to ensure that Nguyễn Văn Thiệu would get elected. The CIA covertly funded Thiệu and his political allies, as well as pressuring political parties to act in a compliant way.

References

Further reading
 

 
Electoral fraud
Ethically disputed political practices